The 1915 Nebraska Cornhuskers football team represented the University of Nebraska in the 1915 college football season. The team was coached by fifth-year head coach Ewald O. Stiehm and played its home games at Nebraska Field in Lincoln, Nebraska. They competed as members of the Missouri Valley Conference. The 1915 season was part of Nebraska's 34-game unbeaten streak that ran from 1912 to 1916.

Following the season, Guy Chamberlin was named the first All-American in Nebraska history. Stiehm, who had won the MVC in each of his five seasons at Nebraska and also coached the school's basketball team, was offered $4,500 annually to take over Indiana's athletic department. Despite suggesting he'd remain at Nebraska for less money, the school refused to offer him a raise and Stiehm exited with the highest winning percentage of any coach in school history.

Schedule

Coaching staff

Roster

Starters

Game summaries

Drake

Sources:

Kansas State

Sources:

Washburn

Sources:

Notre Dame

Sources:

This was the first meeting between Nebraska and Notre Dame. Written accounts of this game compare with NU's 7-0 victory over Minnesota in 1913 and 6–6 tie against Michigan in 1911. Nebraska trailed 13–7 at halftime but a pair of late touchdowns gave the Cornhuskers a one-point win.

at Iowa State

Sources:

Nebraska Wesleyan

Sources:

at Kansas

Sources:

Iowa

Sources:

References

Nebraska
Nebraska Cornhuskers football seasons
Missouri Valley Conference football champion seasons
College football undefeated seasons
Nebraska Cornhuskers football